Adelphia is the second studio album by American post-hardcore band A Skylit Drive and the first on Fearless Records. It was released on June 9, 2009. The album peaked at 64 on the Billboard 200 as well as number 11 on the Top Independent Albums.

Track listing
All lyrics written by Michael Jagmin and Nick Miller.

Personnel
A Skylit Drive
Michael "Jag" Jagmin - Lead vocals
Joey Wilson - Lead guitar
Nick Miller - Rhythm guitar
Brian White - unclean vocals, Bass
Cory La Quay - Drums, backing unclean vocals
Kyle Simmons - Keyboards, programming

Artwork and design
 Kevin Knight – Art direction, photography

Production and recording
 Casey Bates - Producer, engineering
 Alan Douches - Mastering
 Machine - Mixing
 Will Putney - Mixing, assistant engineering

Chart positions

References

A Skylit Drive albums
2009 albums
Fearless Records albums